The Al Mannai tribe (plural: Al Mananea “AlMannaei()) is an Arab tribe, based primarily in the Arab states of the Persian Gulf. In Bahrain, the traditional home of the tribe has been Galali village. Al Mannai family in Bahrain are known to be involved in natural pearl trade, The history of the Al-Mannai Family in the field of trading goes back to 1824 when Mr. Salem Bin Darwish Al Mannai, the head of the dam family established the pearl trading business in Bahrain.

Al Mannai tribes are located in the whole Persian Gulf area, especially in Qatar and Bahrain. This is demonstrated by the establishment of one of the largest Corporations in Qatar, the Mannai Corporation, which has interest in Steel, Information Technology, Consumer Products, Automobiles..etc. Its subsidiary entities are extended world wide and has bases in international locations.

Al Mannai today has many known tribes, such as:
 Al-Badeed
 Al-Binejmy
 Al-Hashel
 Al-Salam 
 Al-Ibrahim 
 Al-Najam
 Al-Salah
 Al-Hamad
 Al-Khamis
 Al-Najim
 Al-Rumul

The Mannai family brought out other family names such as Attiyah() .

The mother of Hamad bin Khalifa Al Thani, the former Emir of Qatar, is from the Attiyah family.

In Qatar, the Al Mannai were historically based in the village of Abu Dhalouf. J. G. Lorimer, a British historian, stated that in 1978 the village was inhabited by 70 families of the Al Mannai tribe.

References

External links
 Al Mannai website

Tribes of Arabia
Qatari families
Bahraini families
Bedouin groups